Fatih Çakıroğlu (born April 14, 1981, in Istanbul), is a Turkish European champion Turkish freestyle wrestler competing in the 125 kg division.

Çakıroğlu graduated from the Ondokuz Mayıs University in Samsun with a degree in Physical Education and Sports.

Career 
 2002 European Championships - 
 2004 Olympics in Athens, Greece - 9th place (96 kg)
 2006 International Golden Grand Prix in Baku, Azerbaijan - (96 kg)
 2007 European Championships in Sofia, Bulgaria - 
 2007 World Championships in Baku, Azerbaijan - 5th place (120 kg)
 2008 International Alexander Medved Tournament in Minsk, Belarus -  (120 kg)
 2009 Mediterranean Games in Pescara, Italy -  (120 kg)
 2010 European Championships in Baku, Azerbaijan -  (120 kg)
 2010 International Golden Grand Prix in Baku, Azerbaijan -  (120 kg)
 2010 World Championships in Moscow, Russia - lost in the 2nd round (120 kg)
 2011 European Championships in Dortmund, Germany -  (120 kg)

References

External links 
 

Living people
Turkish male sport wrestlers
European Wrestling Championships medalists
1981 births
Olympic wrestlers of Turkey
Wrestlers at the 2004 Summer Olympics
European champions for Turkey
Mediterranean Games gold medalists for Turkey
Mediterranean Games medalists in wrestling
20th-century Turkish people
21st-century Turkish people